San Mateo-Foster City School District is a school district in San Mateo and Foster City, California. It consists of twenty schools: three middle schools (Grades 6–8), fourteen elementary schools (TK/K–5), and three schools with all grades (K–8). With a total enrollment of approximately 12,500 students (in 2015–16), it is the largest school district in San Mateo County. Students in the San Mateo-Foster City School District continue on to the San Mateo Union High School District.

History

Measure L
Measure L was passed in February 2008, and provided funds to modernize and repair schools in the district.

Measure P
Measure P was placed on the November 2013 ballot, but failed to pass. Measure P would have funded capital programs to add a fifth grade to Bowditch Middle School and reopen Knolls Elementary, but debates on Measure P exposed a rift between Foster City and San Mateo residents who felt that Measure P provided disproportionate benefits to the smaller Foster City. Final voting showed support for Measure P in Foster City was outweighed by opposition in San Mateo.

Measure X
Measure X was passed in November 2015, and committed to:
Phase I
 Building a new elementary school in Foster City (Charter Square site)
 Building new classrooms and gyms at Abbott and Borel Middle Schools
 Building a new gym at Bayside Academy
Phase II (planning to start in 2019)
 Building new classrooms and replacing administration building at Bowditch Middle School
 Building new classrooms and new multipurpose rooms to George Hall and Sunnybrae
 Building a new neighborhood elementary school at College Park

After Measure P failed to pass, Measure X was written with input from an eight-member committee which held nearly 100 public meetings from 2014 to 2015 to come up with recommendations to increase district capacity while maintaining equal opportunities for all students. Rather than reopen Knolls Elementary, Measure X included the creation of a new elementary school at College Park, drawing students from the surrounding North Central neighborhood. The current elementary school at College Park, which had served neighborhood children prior to its conversion to a Mandarin-language immersion school, had a history of poor academic performance.

In November 2018, the District announced that due to the rising cost of construction, the elementary school at Charter Square would not be built, but acquisition of the land from developer Westlake Urban, who had previously operated a shopping mall at the site, would continue. The final cost of the acquisition and the construction was estimated to exceed the total project $61 M budget by $11 M. The final cost of land acquisition is anticipated to be $30.1 M.

Measure Y
Measure Y, proposing an extension of an existing parcel tax which generated $7 million annually, failed to reach the two-thirds supermajority required to pass in an all-mail ballot held in March 2017.

Measure V
Measure V, proposing a parcel tax of approximately $298 per property to generate a projected $10 million annually, passed with 67.9% of the vote, just over the required two-thirds majority of those voting in the November 2018 election.

Schools

Notes

Bowditch Middle
One of the schools is Bowditch Middle School. It has 6th, 7th, and 8th graders. Bowditch was named after Nathaniel Bowditch and consists of more than 1,000 students. There is a principal, and two assistant principals. Bowditch is a big school, with more than 40 classrooms. They are more commonly known as the Buccaneers, and have an orchestra, band, soccer, flag football, track and more.

Knolls Elementary
Knolls Elementary, at 525 42nd Avenue in San Mateo, is on the southern edge of the district. It was closed in 1989, but reopened temporarily in 2011 after refurbishment and modernization using Measure L funds to temporarily house Fiesta Gardens students while that site was undergoing renovations, which were completed in 2013.

Bayside Academy
Bayside, at 2025 Kehoe Ave in San Mateo, is a K-8 school. It hosts the Mandarin Immersion and GATE (Giften And Talented Education) for middle school. It also has a new gym built recently.

Demographics

References

External links
 Official San Mateo-Foster City School District web site 

School districts in San Mateo County, California